The 1918–19 season was Stoke's fourth season in the non-competitive War League.

With the start of World War I, all Football League football was cancelled. In its place were formed War Leagues, based on geographical lines rather than based on previous league placement. Stoke contested the Lancashire Section in the Principal Tournament, and the Lancashire Section Secondary Competition Group C. However, none of these were considered to be competitive football, and thus their records are not recognised by the Football League.

Season review
The final war-time season of 1918–19 saw Stoke take the runners-up spot behind Everton. Stoke were again in impressive goal scoring form among those victories were those of 8–1 over Port Vale, 7–0 v Blackburn Rovers and 7–1 v Bolton Wanderers. Bob Whittingham top scored again with 23 goals taking his war-time total for Stoke to 86. With the war now over it was announced that the Football League would return for the 1919–20 season and Stoke were due to enter the Second Division.

Final league table

Lancashire Section Primary Competition

Lancashire Section Secondary Competition Group C

Results

Stoke's score comes first

Legend

Lancashire Section Primary Competition

Lancashire Section Secondary Competition Group C

Squad statistics

References

Stoke City F.C. seasons
Stoke